The 2010 Tennessee Volunteers football team represented the University of Tennessee in the 2010 NCAA Division I FBS football season. The team was coached by Derek Dooley who was in his first season as the 22nd coach in UT football history. The Vols played their home games at Neyland Stadium and competed in the Eastern Division of the Southeastern Conference. The Vols played seven home games this season. Derek Dooley won his coaching debut with the Vols 50–0 versus Tennessee-Martin on September 4, 2010, in front of 99,123 at Neyland Stadium.

They finished the regular season 6–6, 3–5 in SEC play and were invited to the Music City Bowl where they were defeated by North Carolina 27–30.

Personnel

Coaching staff
 Derek Dooley – Head Coach
 Justin Wilcox – Defensive Coordinator
 Jim Chaney – Offensive Coordinator/Offensive Line Coach
 Chuck Smith – Defensive Line Coach
 Charlie Baggett– Assistant Head Coach/Wide Receivers Coach
 Lance Thompson – Linebackers Coach
 Eric Russell – Tight Ends/Special Teams Coach
 Terry Joseph – Defensive Backs Coach/Recruiting Coordinator
 Harry Hiestand – Offensive Line Coach
 Darin Hinshaw – Quarterbacks Coach

Schedule

Schedule Source: Dates and Matchups for all SEC Football Games for the 2010 SEC Season

Game summaries

Tennessee-Martin

Oregon

 

Tennessee hosted Oregon on September 11, 2010. The Volunteers took an early lead of 6–0, before a lightning warning delayed the game for over seventy minutes; during the delay the score was 13–3. Oregon would go on to score 45 unanswered points to cruise to an easy 35 point win despite the weather, which appeared to hinder Oregon's fast-paced offense.

Florida

UAB

LSU

Georgia

Alabama

South Carolina

Memphis

Mississippi

Vanderbilt

Kentucky

Depth chart
Starters and backups (Subject to Change)

Returning starters in bold

Team players drafted into the NFL

Reference:

References

Tennessee
Tennessee Volunteers football seasons
Tennessee Volunteers football